The 2013–14 Syracuse Orange men's basketball team represented Syracuse University during the 2013–14 NCAA Division I men's basketball season. The team played its home games at the Carrier Dome in Syracuse, New York. This marked Syracuse's inaugural season in the Atlantic Coast Conference, having moved from the Big East Conference. They finished the season 28–6, 14–4 in ACC play to finish in second place. They lost in the quarterfinals of the ACC tournament to North Carolina State. They received an at-large bid to the NCAA tournament where they defeated Western Michigan in the second round before losing in the third round to Dayton. They started the season 25–0 before losing 6 of their final 9 games.

Preseason

Roster changes
Syracuse lost two major contributors to graduation, combo guard Brandon Triche and small forward James Southerland.  In addition, point guard Michael Carter-Williams left for the NBA.

Syracuse added five incoming freshmen including key contributor Tyler Ennis, and swingman Michael Gbinije became eligible after sitting out the 2012-13 season because of NCAA transfer rules.

Recruits

Preseason outlook

At ACC Media Days, members of the media voted C.J. Fair the preseason Player of the Year.  The media ranked SU the number two team in the conference behind Duke.

In its preseason rankings, The Sporting News ranked Syracuse eighth overall and second in the ACC behind Duke.  TSN named C.J. Fair a third-team All-American.

Lindy’s Sports ranked Syracuse twelfth in its preseason ranking, third in the ACC behind Duke and North Carolina.  Lindy's named C.J. Fair its pre-season Player of the Year for the ACC.

Blue Ribbon College Basketball Yearbook ranked Syracuse eighth in its preseason ranking, second in the ACC behind Duke.

Roster

Depth chart

Schedule

|-
!colspan=12 style="background:#FF6F00; color:#212B6D;"| Exhibition

|-
!colspan=12 style="background:#FF6F00; color:#212B6D;"| Regular season

|-
!colspan=12 style="background:#FF6F00; color:#212B6D;"| ACC regular season

|-
!colspan=12 style="background:#FF6F00; color:#212B6D;"| ACC Tournament

|-
!colspan=12 style="background:#FF6F00; color:#212B6D;"| NCAA tournament

Rankings

2014–15 Recruiting

2015–16 Recruiting

2016–17 Recruiting

References

External links

Syracuse Orange men's basketball seasons
Syracuse
Syracuse
Syracuse Orange men's b
Syracuse Orange men's b